The 15th Delaware General Assembly was a meeting of the legislative branch of the state government, consisting of the Delaware Legislative Council and the Delaware House of Assembly. Elections were held the first day of October and terms began on the twentieth day of October. It met in Dover, Delaware, convening October 20, 1790, and was the second year of the administration of President Joshua Clayton. 

The apportionment of seats was permanently assigned to three councilors and seven assemblymen for each of the three counties. Population of the county did not effect the number of delegates.

Leadership

Legislative Council
George Mitchell, Sussex County

House of Assembly
Henry Latimer, New Castle County

Members

Legislative Council
Councilors were elected by the public for a three-year term, one third posted each year.

House of Assembly
Assemblymen were elected by the public for a one-year term.

References

1 015
1790 in Delaware
1791 in Delaware